Krakow is an unincorporated community in Franklin County, in the U.S. state of Missouri. The community is situated on Missouri Route A, between Union to the south and Washington to the north.

History
A post office called Krakow was established in 1871, and remained in operation until 1953. The community was named after Kraków, in Poland, the native home of a share of the early settlers.

References

Unincorporated communities in Franklin County, Missouri
Unincorporated communities in Missouri